The Miss South Carolina competition is the pageant that selects the representative for the state of South Carolina in the Miss America pageant. The pageant was first held in Myrtle Beach and moved to Greenville starting in 1958 and remained in that city until the 1990s. Spartanburg hosted the pageant in a few different venues until new leadership took over the organization and moved the pageant to Columbia, SC in 2011. The pageant was televised since the 1960s until the 1998 pageant. Televising was resumed with the 2000 pageant through 2006. The pageant returned to television in 2014.

Two South Carolina women have become Miss America; Marian McKnight of Manning in 1957 and Kimberly Aiken of Columbia in 1994. Six more have been first runner-up at the national competition and another thirteen have placed in the Top Ten. The Miss South Carolina organization is the leading state pageant in the nation in scholarship money raised for young women- surpassing many much larger states.

Jill Dudley of Myrtle Beach was crowned Miss South Carolina 2022 on June 25, 2022 at Township Auditorium in Columbia, South Carolina. She competed for the title of Miss America 2023 at the Mohegan Sun in Uncasville, Connecticut in December 2022.

Gallery of past titleholders

Results summary
The following is a visual summary of the past results of Miss South Carolina titleholders at the national Miss America pageants/competitions. The year in parentheses indicates the year of the national competition during which a placement and/or award was garnered, not the year attached to the contestant's state title.

Placements
 Miss Americas: Marian McKnight (1957), Kimberly Clarice Aiken (1994)
 1st runners-up: Claudia Turner (1971), Lavinia Cox (1977), Sherry Thrift (1986), Mary Gainey (1991), Ali Rogers (2013), Rachel Wyatt (2017)
 2nd runners-up: Polly Suber (1955), Catherine Hinson (1978), Dawn Smith (1987)
 3rd runners-up: Evelyn Ellis (1963)
 4th runners-up: N/A
 Top 7: Daja Dial (2016)
 Top 10: Joyce Perry (1952), Mary Griffin (1953), Miriam Stevenson (1954), Edith Sandra Browning (1961), Nancy Moore (1966), Cynthia Anthony (1976), Carrie Lee Davis (1993), Erika Grace Powell (2006), Suzi Roberts (2018)
 Top 12: Bree Boyce (2012)
 Top 15: Mary Claudia Harvin (1927), LaBruce Sherill (1940), Kelly McCorkle (2003)
 Top 16: Crystal Garrett (2008)
 Top 20: Jeanna Raney (2002)

Awards

Preliminary awards
 Preliminary Lifestyle and Fitness: Polly Suber (1955), Edith Sandra Browning (1961), Barbara Harris (1967), Claudia Turner (1971), Lavinia Cox (1977), Catherine Hinson (1978), Dawn Smith (1987), Nancy Humphries (1988), Carrie Lee Davis (1993), Ali Rogers (2013), Daja Dial (2016)
 Preliminary Talent: LaBruce Sherill (1940), Nancy Moore (1966), Valarie (Valerie) Trapp (1996), Kimilee Bryant (1990), Erika Grace Powell (2006)

Non-finalist awards
 Non-finalist Talent: Margaret Seible (1945), Gene Wilson (1959), Mary Diane Toole (1979), Julia Hill (1983), Amanda Spivey (1996), Janet Powers (1998), Heather Hudson (2001), Jessica Eddins (2004), Shelley Bryson Benthall (2007), Anna Perry (2009)

Other awards
 Miss Congeniality: Brooke Mosteller (2014) (tie)
 Active International Scholarship for Business and Marketing: Jeanna Raney (2002)
 Bernie Wayne Performing Arts Scholarship: Erika Grace Powell (2006)
 Children's Miracle Network (CMN) Miracle Maker Award: Brooke Mosteller (2014), Lanie Hudson (2015), Suzi Roberts (2018), Davia Bunch (2019), Morgan Nichols (2020)
 CMN Miracle Maker Award 1st runners-up: Rachel Wyatt (2017)
 George Cavalier Talent Award: Kimilee Bryant (1990)
 Quality of Life Award / Social Impact Initiative Scholarship 1st runners-up: Brooke Mosteller (2014), Morgan Nichols (2020)
 Quality of Life Award 2nd runners-up: Suzi Roberts (2018)
 STEM Scholarship Award Winners: Morgan Nichols (2020)
Top Fundraiser: Julia Herrin (2022)

Winners

References

External links
 Official website

South Carolina
South Carolina culture
Women in South Carolina
Annual events in South Carolina
Recurring events established in 1923
1923 establishments in South Carolina